Michal Drahno (born 28 January 1979 in Žilina) is a Slovak football defender who currently plays for MŠK Žilina B - Kotrčina Lúčka.

External links
Fotbalportal profile

References

1979 births
Living people
Sportspeople from Žilina
Slovak footballers
Association football defenders
MŠK Žilina players
FK Inter Bratislava players
ŠK Eldus Močenok players
FC Senec players
Slovak Super Liga players
ND Gorica players
NK Mura players
NK Bela Krajina players
Expatriate footballers in Slovenia